South Korean singer and the youngest member of SS501, Kim Hyung-jun has released two EPs, 10 singles, ten soundtrack contribution songs, four collaboration songs, and three DVDs.

During 2005-2010, Kim has had three solo songs from SS501 albums: "Sayonara Ga Dekinai" from Kokoro, "I Am" from U R Man album, and "Hey G" from SS501 Solo Collection. He also released two Korean singles entitled Men from Mars, Women from Venus and S-Wave 1st Present, and contributed "Lonely Girl" with Kim Kyu-jong from Bad Girl Diary OST.

On March 8, 2011, Kim released his debut solo mini album My Girl with music videos for the two lead tracks "oH! aH!" and "Girl". A Japanese version was released on April 6 with two bonus tracks of Japanese versions of the two lead tracks.

In July 2012, he released his second mini album entitled Escape with its single "Sorry, I'm Sorry". The album includes five songs, and a 25-minute drama MV starring Kang Ji-hwan, Lee Ki-woo, and himself. He, then, held his first solo live tour ‘2012 1st Story in Japan' in April and '2012 2nd Story in Japan' in August consecutively.

In February 2013, it was announced that Kim will be having his very first solo concert in Korea to commemorate his 2nd anniversary since his solo debut in 2011. Ticket sales were pre-released on February 12 Kim Hyung Jun "The First", the name of the concert, was held on March 9 at the Woori Art Hall at the Olympic Park, organized by SPLUS Entertainment and managed by SH Creative Works.

Extended plays

Singles

Promotional singles

As featured artist

Soundtrack contributions

Video albums

Videography

Music videos

Others

Production credits

Concerts/Major Fan meetings

The following is an incomplete list of Kim Hyung-jun's concerts, major fanmeetings, and tours.

See also
 SS501 discography
 Kim Hyun-joong discography
 Heo Young-saeng discography
 Kim Kyu-jong discography
 Park Jung-min discography

References

External links
  
  
  
 

SS501
Discographies of South Korean artists
Pop music discographies